Chaha or Cheha (in Chaha and Amharic: ቸሃ čehā or čexā) is a Gurage language spoken in central Ethiopia, mainly within the Gurage Zone in the Southern Nations, Nationalities and Peoples Region. It is also spoken by Gurage settlers in Ethiopian cities, especially Addis Ababa. Chaha is known to many phonologists and morphologists for its very complex morphophonology.

Speakers
According to Ethnologue, the dialects of SBG (Sebat Bet Gurage) are Chaha (čäxa), Ezha (äža), Gumer (or Gwemare, gʷämarä), Gura, Gyeto (or Gyeta, gʸäta), and Muher (or Mwahr, mʷäxǝr).  However, some of these are sometimes considered languages in their own right.  In particular, Muher diverges so much from the other dialects that it is not necessarily even treated as a member of the Western Gurage group to which SBG belongs.

This article focuses on the Chaha dialect, which has been studied more than the others.
Unless otherwise indicated, all examples are Chaha.

Sounds and orthography

Consonants and vowels 
SBG has a fairly typical set of phonemes for an Ethiopian Semitic language. There is the usual set of ejective consonants as well as plain voiceless and voiced consonants. However, the Chaha language also has a larger set of palatalized and labialized consonants than most other Ethiopian Semitic languages. Besides the typical seven vowels of these languages, SBG has open-mid front and back vowels. Some of the dialects have both short and long vowel phonemes, and some have nasalized vowels.

The charts below show the phones of the Chaha dialect; exactly how many phonemes there are is a matter of controversy because of the complexity of SBG morphophonology.
For the representation of SBG sounds, this article uses a modification of a system that is common (though not universal) among linguists who work on Ethiopian Semitic languages, but it differs somewhat from the conventions of the International Phonetic Alphabet. When the IPA symbol is different, it is indicated in brackets in the
charts.

Morphophonology
In addition to the complexity in verb morphology characteristic of all Semitic languages, SBG exhibits another level of complexity because of the intricate relationship between the set of consonants in the root of a verb and how they are realized in a particular form of that verb or a noun derived from that verb.
For example, the verb meaning 'open' has a root consisting of the consonants {kft} (as it does in most other Ethiopian Semitic languages).
In some forms we see all of these consonants.
For example, the third person singular masculine perfective Chaha form meaning 'he opened' is käfätä-m.
However, when the impersonal of this same verb is used, meaning roughly 'he was opened', two of the stem consonants are changed: 'käfʷäč-i-m'.

At least three different phonological processes play a role in SBG morphophonology.

Devoicing and "gemination"
In most Ethiopian Semitic languages, gemination, that is, consonant lengthening, plays a role in distinguishing words from one another and in the grammar of verbs.

For example, in Amharic, the second consonant of a three-consonant verb root is doubled in the perfective: {sdb} 'insult', säddäbä 'he insulted'. In Chaha and some other SBG dialects (but not Ezha or Muher), gemination is replaced by devoicing.  For example, the verb root meaning 'insult' is the same in SBG as in Amharic (with b replaced by β), but in the perfective the second consonant becomes t in the non-geminating dialects: sätäβä-m 'he insulted'.

Only voiced consonants can be devoiced: b/β → p, d → t, g → k, bʷ → pʷ, ǧ → č, gʸ → kʸ, gʷ → kʷ, z → s, ž → š.

The "devoiced/geminated" form of r is n.
Other voiced consonants are not devoiced.

Labialization
Several morphological processes cause consonants to be labialized (rounded).
For example, from the three-consonant verb root {gkr} 'be straight', there is the derived adjective gʷǝkʷǝr 'straight'.

Labial and velar consonants can be labialized: p → pʷ, b → bʷ, β → w, f → fʷ, k → kʷ, ḳ → ḳʷ, g → gʷ, x → xʷ.

Palatalization, depalatalization
Several morphological processes cause consonants to be palatalized.
For example, the second-person feminine singular form of verbs in the imperfective and jussive/imperative palatalizes one of the root consonants (if one is palatalizable): {kft} 'open', tǝkäft 'you (m.) open', tǝkäfč 'you (f.) open'.

Dental and velar consonants can be palatalized: t → č, ṭ → č̣, d → ǧ, s → š, z → ž, k → kʸ, ḳ → ḳʸ, g → gʸ, x → xʸ.

r palatalizes to y.

In one morphological environment the reverse process takes place.
In the imperative/jussive form of one class of verbs, the first consonant in the root is depalatalized if this is possible.
For example, the verb meaning 'return' (transitive) has the stem consonants {žpr} in other forms, for example, žäpärä-m 'he returned', but the ž is depalatalized  to z in the imperative zäpǝr 'return! (m.)'.

Allophones
The relationship among n, r, and l is complex. At least within verb stems,  and  may be treated as allophones of a single phoneme.
 nämädä-m 'he liked', tä-rämädä-m 'he was liked'
 yǝ-βära 'he eats', bäna-m 'he ate' ("geminated")
 sǝräpätä-m 'he spent some time', wä-sämbǝt 'to spend some time' (the n becomes m because of the following b)

Banksira also argues that k is an allophone of x and b an allophone of β.

Orthography
Chaha is transcribed using the Ge'ez (Ethiopic) writing system. It was originally developed for the now-extinct Ge'ez language, and now serves as the orthography for Amharic and Tigrinya. Although there are still relatively few texts in the language, three novels have appeared in the Chaha dialect (by Sahlä  and Gäbräyäsus Haylämaryam).

To represent the palatalized consonants not found in Ge'ez, Amharic, or Tigrinya, modified characters were introduced to the script, such as using wedges on the tops. The original use of this was done in the New Testament published by the Ethiopian Bible Society, then for the entire Bible; it has now become generally adopted.

See also
Inor – Another Western Gurage language.
Soddo – A Northern Gurage language.
Zay and Silt'e – Eastern Gurage languages.
Gurage

References

Banksira, Degif Petros. (2000). Sound Mutations: the Morphophonology of Chaha. Amsterdam: John Benjamins. .
Bustorf, Dirk and Carolyn M. Ford. (2003). "Chaha Ethnography”, in: Siegbert Uhlig (ed.): Encyclopaedia Aethiopica, vol. 1: A-C, Wiesbaden: Harrassowitz Verlag, p. 664.
Cohen, Marcel (1931). Études d'éthiopien méridional. Société Asiatique, Collection d'ouvrages orientaux. Paris: Geuthner.
Ford, Carolyn M. (2003). "Chaha language", in: Siegbert Uhlig (ed.): Encyclopaedia Aethiopica, vol. 1: A-C, Wiesbaden: Harrassowitz Verlag, p. 663f.
Goldenberg, Gideon. (1974). "L'étude du gouragué et la comparaison chamito-sémitique", in: Accademia Nazionale dei Lincei, Roma – Problemi attuali di Scienza e di Cultura, Quaderno N. 191 II, pp. 235–249 [=Studies in Semitic Linguistics: Selected Writings by Gideon Goldenberg, Jerusalem: The Magnes Press 1998, pp. 463–477].
Goldenberg, Gideon. (1977). "The Semitic Languages of Ethiopia and Their Classification", in: Bulletin of the School of Oriental and African Studies 40, pp. 461–507 [=Selected Writings, pp. 286–332].
Goldenberg, Gideon. (1987). "Linguistic Interest in Gurage and the Gurage Etymological Dictionary". Review article of W. Leslau, Etymological Dictionary of Gurage (see below). in: Annali, Istituto Universitario Orientale di Napoli 47, pp. 75–98 [=Selected Writings, pp. 439–462].
Hetzron, R. (1972). Ethiopian Semitic: studies in classification. Manchester: Manchester University Press. . But his conclusions are not accepted by all. Refer Etymological Dictionary of Gurage by Wolf Leslau.
Hetzron, Robert. (1977). The Gunnän-Gurage Languages. Napoli: Istituto Orientale di Napoli.
Hudson, Grover. (ed.) (1996). Essays on Gurage Language and Culture. Dedicated to Wolf Leslau on the occasion of his 90th birthday. Wiesbaden: Harrassowitz. . 
Leslau, W. (1950). Ethiopic Documents: Gurage. Viking Fund Publications in Anthropology, No. 14. New York: The Viking Fund.
Leslau, Wolf. (1965). Ethiopians Speak: Studies in Cultural Background. Berkeley: University of California Press.
Leslau, Wolf. (1979). Etymological Dictionary of Gurage (Ethiopic). 3 vols. Wiesbaden: Otto Harrassowitz. 
Leslau, Wolf. (1981). Ethiopians Speak: Studies in Cultural Background. Part IV : Muher. Äthiopistische Forschungen, Band 11. Wiesbaden: Franz Steiner Verlag. .
Leslau, Wolf. (1983). Ethiopians Speak: Studies in Cultural Background. Part V : Chaha – Ennemor. Äthiopistische Forschungen, Band 16. Wiesbaden: Franz Steiner Verlag. 
Leslau, Wolf. (1992). Gurage Studies: Collected Articles. Wiesbaden: Otto Harrassowitz. . 
Polotsky, H.J. (1938). "Études de grammaire gouragué", in: Bulletin de la Société de Linguistique de Paris 39, pp. 137–175 [=Collected Papers by H.J. Polotsky, Jerusalem: The Magnes Press 1971, pp. 477–515].
Polotsky, H.J. (1939). "L labialisé en gouragué mouher", in: GLECS 3, pp. 66–68 [=Collected Papers, pp. 516–518].
Polotsky, H.J. (1951). Notes on Gurage grammar. Notes and Studies published by the Israel Oriental Society, No. 2 [=Collected Papers, pp. 519–573].
Shack, William A. and Habte-Mariam Marcos (1974). Gods and heroes, Oral Traditions of the Gurage of Ethiopia. Oxford: Clarendon Press. .

External links
"Jesus film" in Western Gurage
"Words of Life" – recordings in Chaha at the Recordings Network website
The Gurage and Silte Research Group
The homepage of Sharon Rose at the University of California, San Diego Linguistics Department
BeteGuraghe.org

Outer Ethiopian Semitic languages
Languages of Ethiopia